F.U.E.P. (Fuck You Extended Play) is the first extended play by British recording artist Lily Allen. It was released on 31 March 2009 by Capitol Records exclusively to iTunes U.S. store. Its cover art is a simple shot taken during the It's Not Me, It's You promo shoot. It features a clean edit of "Fuck You", the cover of Britney Spears' song "Womanizer" and the B-sides to the single "The Fear", entitled "Fag Hag" and "Kabul Shit".

Track listing

References 

2009 debut EPs
Lily Allen albums
Capitol Records EPs
Albums produced by Greg Kurstin
Contemporary R&B EPs
Dance-pop EPs